9.11.2011 Toronto, Canada is a 2011 live album released by American alternative rock band, Pearl Jam. The album was released exclusively as a free digital download through Google Play Music on November 10 in anticipation of the official launch of said site on November 16.

Overview
The album was recorded during Pearl Jam's September 11, 2011, show in Toronto, Ontario at the Air Canada Centre. The concert commemorated the tenth anniversary of the 9/11 attacks on the World Trade Center and The Pentagon. The band was also in Toronto, as their Cameron Crowe-directed documentary, Pearl Jam Twenty, had premiered at the Toronto International Film Festival the night before. This was the first of two shows played in Toronto on consecutive days during the Pearl Jam Twenty Tour. The opening act for the September 11 and 12 shows was Mudhoney. The concert also marked the first time that Pearl Jam had played Toronto since August 21, 2009.

Track listing

Personnel
Pearl Jam
Jeff Ament – bass guitar
Matt Cameron – drums
Stone Gossard – rhythm guitar
Mike McCready – lead guitar
Eddie Vedder – lead vocals, guitar

Additional musicians
Boom Gaspar – Hammond B-3, keyboards
Neil Young – vocals and guitar on "Rockin' in the Free World"

References

External links
Toronto, Ontario Air Canada Centre Sep 11, 2011  at Pearl Jam's official website
Toronto 9.11.11 Pearl Jam  at Google Music
Pearl Jam Twenty (2011) at IMDb

Pearl Jam live albums
2011 live albums
Self-released albums
Monkeywrench Records live albums